SIFA may refer to:
 Sifa, a type of train safety system
 Sainsbury Institute for Art  
 Schools Interoperability Framework Association  
 Singapore International Festival of Arts
 Sweden India Film Association
 Sifa or Si Pha is the pen name of Thai author M.L. Srifa Ladavalaya Mahawan
 Shooting Industry Foundation of Australia, a pro-gun trade organization in Australia.